Halwin is a hamlet in Cornwall, England which adjoins Porkellis and is northeast of Wendron (where the 2011 census population was included).

References

Hamlets in Cornwall